The 2018 cycling season began in Australia at the Tour Down Under for Team Sky in January.

As a UCI WorldTeam, they are automatically invited and obliged to send a squad to every event in the UCI World Tour.

2018 roster

Riders who joined the team for the 2018 season

Riders who left the team during or after the 2017 season

Season victories

National, Continental and World champions 2018

Footnotes

References

External links
 

2018 in British sport
2018 road cycling season by team
Ineos Grenadiers